Enyalioides microlepis, the small-scaled woodlizard or tiny-scale dwarf iguana, is a species of lizards in the genus Enyalioides, from Peru, Colombia, and Ecuador.

References
 

Reptiles described in 1881
Lizards of South America
Reptiles of Colombia
Reptiles of Ecuador
Reptiles of Peru
Enyalioides
Taxa named by Arthur William Edgar O'Shaughnessy